Metuchen is a suburban borough in Middlesex County in the U.S. state of New Jersey. The borough is a commuter town of New York City, located in the heart of the Raritan Valley region within the New York Metropolitan area. The borough, along with Edison (which completely surrounds Metuchen), is a regional commercial hub for Central New Jersey.

As of the 2020 United States census, the borough's population was 15,049, an increase of 1,475 (+10.9%) from the 2010 census count of 13,574, which in turn reflected an increase of 734 (+5.7%) from the 12,840 counted in the 2000 census.

Metuchen was incorporated as a borough by an act of the New Jersey Legislature on March 20, 1900, from portions of Raritan Township (now known as Edison).

History

The earliest residents of the area were the Raritan people of the Lenape Native Americans, who lived in the area and travelled through it to the shore. In 1646, Chief Matouchin was part of a group that included 1,200 warriors.

Until 1870, what is now Metuchen was part of Woodbridge Township. Because the settlers in the western part of the township were so far removed from the main settlement of Woodbridge, they early-on developed a separate identity. The name "Metuchen" first appeared in 1688/1689, and its name was derived from the name of a Native American chief, known as Matouchin or Matochshegan. In 1701, an overseer of roads was appointed for "Metuchen district". In 1705, Main Street was laid out at the same time as the road from Metuchen to Woodbridge, which one source calls a "reworking of the original road".

Sometime between 1717 and 1730, a meeting house was constructed for weekday meetings conducted by the pastor of the Woodbridge Presbyterian Church. In 1756, Metuchen Presbyterians succeeded in forming their own congregation, attesting to their growing numbers. In 1770, the congregations merged, with Metuchen getting 2/5 of the pastor's services and Woodbridge 3/5; by 1772, Metuchen had grown sufficiently to warrant half of his time. In 1793, the two churches again separated.

From the late 18th to the early 19th century Metuchen grew little. A map of 1799 shows ten buildings in the center of town along Main Street. By 1834, a Presbyterian church, a store, two taverns and about a dozen dwellings could be found. The opening of the Middlesex and Essex Turnpike (now Middlesex Avenue, portions in concurrency with Route 27) in 1806, and the Perth Amboy and Bound Brook Turnpike in 1808 seem not to have spurred growth to any appreciable extent. Not until the beginning of the railroad era did commercial and residential development surge.

In 1836, the New Jersey Railroad was completed to New Brunswick. The construction of a station at Main Street made it inevitable that this would develop as the principal street. A business section soon began to appear between Middlesex Avenue and the railroad tracks, and commercial and service establishments gradually began to assume a more modern aspect (the typical 18th century tavern, for example, was replaced by the equally typical 19th century hotel).

The second half of the 19th century was a period of social, cultural and religious diversification in Metuchen. Between 1859 and 1866 the Reformed Church was organized, the first Catholic mass was celebrated and St. Luke's Episcopal Church was founded. In 1870 both the Building and Loan Association and the library opened, the same year that Raritan Township was incorporated. As the largest village in the new township, Metuchen naturally became its commercial and cultural center and acquired substantial political control. In 1873, the town hosted Howard Newton Fuller and the Rutgers College Glee Club in the first-ever performance of their alma mater. In 1879, the literary and debating society was formed, and in 1883 the Village Improvement Society. By 1882, Metuchen School #15 had an enrollment of 256 pupils, and by 1885 the New Jersey Gazette listed 37 businesses.

The decade of the 1890s was a period of expansion for public utilities. In 1894, telegraph service was begun and in 1897 telephone service begun by the N.Y. and N.J. Telephone Company. In the same year the Midland Water Company began operation and supplied hydrants for "newly formed" volunteer fire companies. In 1899, a new street lighting system was installed. At about the same time a bicycling organization was formed, the Metuchen Wheelmen, which lobbied for improved roads. Trolley service began in 1900. In addition, commerce had grown to such an extent that the New Brunswick Directory listed 91 businesses in 1899.

Metuchen attracted an influx of artists, literary figures and noted intellectuals during this time, acquiring the nickname "the Brainy Boro". One of the Borough's two post offices is named Brainy Boro Station.

The new century began with the borough's incorporation, in 1900.

On November 19, 1981, Metuchen became the Seat of the newly established Roman Catholic Diocese of Metuchen. The diocese includes Hunterdon, Middlesex, Somerset and Warren counties and more than 500,000 Catholics.

Metuchen Borough Hall, dedicated in 2005, replaced a structure built in 1924 during the City Beautiful movement.

From 1948 until 2004 the Ford Motor Company manufactured decades of Ford and Mercury vehicles, including the Ford Mustang, at Edison Assembly.

In 2022, Metuchen was nominated as one of the eight semifinalists for the 2023 Great American Main Street Award 

American Girl's 2023 "Girl of the Year" Kavika Sharma "hails" from Metuchen. She is the first "Girl of the Year" doll of South Asian ancestry.

Geography
According to the United States Census Bureau, the borough had a total area of 2.85 square miles (7.39 km2), including 2.85 square miles (7.38 km2) of land and <0.01 square miles (0.01 km2) of water (0.07%).

The Borough of Metuchen is completely surrounded by Edison, making it part of 21 pairs of "doughnut towns" in the state, where one municipality entirely surrounds another.

Unincorporated communities, localities and place names located partially or completely within the township include Jefferson Park and Robinvale.

Metuchen has been a state-designated "town center" since 1996 and "transit village" in 2001. The borough has been recognized for its smart growth development. Plans to build a residential and commercial center with 700 parking spaces on a parking lot adjacent to the train station were announced in July 2014.

Demographics

2010 census

The Census Bureau's 2006–2010 American Community Survey showed that (in 2010 inflation-adjusted dollars) median household income was $94,410 (with a margin of error of +/− $10,474) and the median family income was $126,123 (+/− $7,549). Males had a median income of $78,974 (+/− $8,613) versus $57,271 (+/− $5,731) for females. The per capita income for the borough was $46,949 (+/− $3,227). About 1.9% of families and 2.5% of the population were below the poverty line, including 3.8% of those under age 18 and 5.7% of those age 65 or over.

2000 census
As of the 2000 United States census there were 12,840 people, 4,992 households, and 3,584 families residing in the borough. The population density was 4,684.8 people per square mile (1,809.3/km2). There were 5,104 housing units at an average density of 1,862.2 per square mile (719.2/km2). The racial makeup of the borough was 93.30% White, 3.38% African American, 0.10% Native American, 7.23% Asian, 1.12% from other races, and 1.86% from two or more races. Hispanic or Latino of any race were 3.96% of the population.

There were 4,992 households, out of which 32.5% had children under the age of 18 living with them, 58.8% were married couples living together, 10.0% had a female householder with no husband present, and 28.2% were non-families. 23.0% of all households were made up of individuals, and 9.6% had someone living alone who was 65 years of age or older. The average household size was 2.57 and the average family size was 3.05.

In the borough the population was spread out, with 23.3% under the age of 18, 5.3% from 18 to 24, 31.3% from 25 to 44, 25.2% from 45 to 64, and 14.9% who were 65 years of age or older. The median age was 40 years. For every 100 females, there were 91.6 males. For every 100 females age 18 and over, there were 87.1 males.

The median income for a household in the borough was $75,546, and the median income for a family was $85,022. Males had a median income of $58,125 versus $43,097 for females. The per capita income for the borough was $36,749. About 3.4% of families and 3.9% of the population were below the poverty line, including 3.6% of those under age 18 and 4.9% of those age 65 or over.

Parks and recreation

Metuchen includes a variety of public spaces, historical sites, a war memorial, and a greenway.

The Middlesex Greenway is a  mixed-use bicycle and pedestrian paved trail between Metuchen and Woodbridge Township. It is part of the East Coast Greenway.

Covering , Centennial Park is Metuchen's largest park and is accessible from Grove Avenue.

Woodwild Park is a  park consisting of undeveloped land that is managed by the Woodwild Park Association and accessible from Middlesex Avenue. It is part of the Middlesex Avenue–Woodwild Park Historic District, which was listed on the National Register of Historic Places on July 31, 2017.

Metuchen Memorial Park is a war memorial that was created starting in 1925 to honor those who served during World War I and has been updated since then to honor those Metuchen residents who served in other of the nation's wars. For 90 years, the park has been the planned destination of the borough's annual Memorial Day Parade.

Tommy's Pond, on a  site donated to the borough in 1929, includes a  pond that is used for an annual fishing derby.

The Dismal Swamp is a nearby natural area known as the "Everglades of Central New Jersey."

Government

Local government
Metuchen is governed under the Borough form of New Jersey municipal government, which is used in 218 municipalities (of the 564) statewide, making it the most common form of government in New Jersey. The governing body is comprised of the mayor and the borough council, with all positions elected at-large on a partisan basis as part of the November general election. A mayor is elected directly by the voters to a four-year term of office. The borough council is comprised of six members elected to serve three-year terms on a staggered basis, with two seats coming up for election each year in a three-year cycle. The Borough form of government used by Metuchen is a "weak mayor / strong council" government in which council members act as the legislative body with the mayor presiding at meetings and voting only in the event of a tie. The mayor can veto ordinances subject to an override by a two-thirds majority vote of the council. The mayor makes committee and liaison assignments for council members, and most appointments are made by the mayor with the advice and consent of the council.

, the Mayor of Metuchen is Democrat Jonathan Busch, whose term of office ends December 31, 2023; Busch took office as mayor when he was appointed in December 2017 to fill the balance of the four-year term that had been held by Peter Cammarano ending December 31, 2019, and was elected in November 2018 to serve the balance of the term of office. Members of the borough council are Joel Branch (D, 2024), Jason Delia (D, 2024), Daniel Hirsch (D, 2023); Linda Koskoski (D, 2022), Tyler Kandel (D, 2023) and Dorothy Rasmussen (D, 2022).

In January 2019, the borough council unanimously selected Daniel Hirsch from a list of three candidates nominated by the Democratic municipal committee to fill the seat expiring in December 2020 that became vacant following the resignation of Reed Leibfried. Hirsch served on an interim basis until the November 2019 general election, when he was elected to serve the balance of the term of office.

In December 2017, Jonathan Busch was selected from three names submitted by the Democratic municipal committee to fill the seat expiring in December 2019 that had been held by Peter Cammarano until he resigned from office to become the chief of staff for Governor of New Jersey Phil Murphy.

Federal, state and county representation
Metuchen is located in the 6th Congressional District and is part of New Jersey's 18th state legislative district.

 

Middlesex County is governed by a Board of County Commissioners, whose seven members are elected at-large on a partisan basis to serve three-year terms of office on a staggered basis, with either two or three seats coming up for election each year as part of the November general election. At an annual reorganization meeting held in January, the board selects from among its members a commissioner director and deputy director. , Middlesex County's Commissioners (with party affiliation, term-end year, and residence listed in parentheses) are 
Commissioner Director Ronald G. Rios (D, Carteret, term as commissioner ends December 31, 2024; term as commissioner director ends 2022),
Commissioner Deputy Director Shanti Narra (D, North Brunswick, term as commissioner ends 2024; term as deputy director ends 2022),
Claribel A. "Clary" Azcona-Barber (D, New Brunswick, 2022),
Charles Kenny (D, Woodbridge Township, 2022),
Leslie Koppel (D, Monroe Township, 2023),
Chanelle Scott McCullum (D, Piscataway, 2024) and 
Charles E. Tomaro (D, Edison, 2023).
Constitutional officers are
County Clerk Nancy Pinkin (D, 2025, East Brunswick),
Sheriff Mildred S. Scott (D, 2022, Piscataway) and 
Surrogate Claribel Cortes (D, 2026; North Brunswick).

Politics

As of March 23, 2011, there were a total of 9,520 registered voters in Metuchen, of which 4,120 (43.3%) were registered as Democrats, 1,528 (16.1%) were registered as Republicans and 3,858 (40.5%) were registered as Unaffiliated. There were 14 voters registered as Libertarians or Greens.

In the 2012 presidential election, Democrat Barack Obama received 61.3% of the vote (4,286 cast), ahead of Republican Mitt Romney with 37.4% (2,618 votes), and other candidates with 1.3% (90 votes), among the 7,049 ballots cast by the borough's 9,779 registered voters (55 ballots were spoiled), for a turnout of 72.1%. In the 2008 presidential election, Democrat Barack Obama received 60.1% of the vote (4,554 cast), ahead of Republican John McCain with 38.3% (2,900 votes) and other candidates with 1.0% (74 votes), among the 7,579 ballots cast by the borough's 9,809 registered voters, for a turnout of 77.3%. In the 2004 presidential election, Democrat John Kerry received 57.9% of the vote (4,152 ballots cast), outpolling Republican George W. Bush with 40.6% (2,914 votes) and other candidates with 0.9% (80 votes), among the 7,170 ballots cast by the borough's 9,348 registered voters, for a turnout percentage of 76.7.

{| align="center" border="2" cellpadding="4" cellspacing="0" style="float:right; margin: 1em 1em 1em 0; border: 1px #aaa solid; border-collapse: collapse; font-size: 95%;"
|+ Gubernatorial Elections Results
|- bgcolor=lightgrey
! Year
!Republican
!Democratic
!Third Parties
|-
| style="text-align:center; |2017
| style="text-align:center; |33.8% 1,605
| style="text-align:center; |63.1%  2,994
| style="text-align:center; background:honeyDew;" |3.0% 144
|-
| style="text-align:center; |2013
| style="text-align:center; |50.1% 2,397
| style="text-align:center; |48.5%  2,319
| style="text-align:center; background:honeyDew;" |1.4% 69
|-
| style="text-align:center; |2009
| style="text-align:center; |43.4% 2,256
| style="text-align:center; |47.0%  2,281
| style="text-align:center; background:honeyDew;" |9.0% 468
|-
| style="text-align:center; |2005| style="text-align:center; |38.2% 1,938
| style="text-align:center; |55.1%'  2,791| style="text-align:center; background:honeyDew;" |4.0% 202|}

In the 2013 gubernatorial election, Republican Chris Christie received 50.1% of the vote (2,397 cast), ahead of Democrat Barbara Buono with 48.5% (2,319 votes), and other candidates with 1.4% (69 votes), among the 4,844 ballots cast by the borough's 9,822 registered voters (59 ballots were spoiled), for a turnout of 49.3%. In the 2009 gubernatorial election, Democrat Jon Corzine received 47.0% of the vote (2,440 ballots cast), ahead of Republican Chris Christie with 43.4% (2,256 votes), Independent Chris Daggett with 8.2% (425 votes) and other candidates with 0.8% (43 votes), among the 5,197 ballots cast by the borough's 9,479 registered voters, yielding a 54.8% turnout.

Education
Public schools

The Metuchen School District serves students in pre-kindergarten through twelfth grade. As of the 2019–20 school year, the district, comprised of four schools, had an enrollment of 2,300 students and 182.2 classroom teachers (on an FTE basis), for a student–teacher ratio of 12.6:1. Schools in the district (with 2019–20 enrollment data from the National Center for Education Statistics) are
Mildred B. Moss Elementary School with 122 students in Pre-kindergarten and kindergarten, 
Campbell Elementary School with 702 students in grades 1–4, 
Edgar Middle School with 722 students in grades 5–8 and 
Metuchen High School with 729 students in grades 9–12.New Jersey School Directory for the Metuchen School District, New Jersey Department of Education. Accessed December 29, 2016.

Eighth grade students from all of Middlesex County are eligible to apply to attend the high school programs offered by the Middlesex County Vocational and Technical Schools, a county-wide vocational school district that offers full-time career and technical education at Middlesex County Academy in Edison, the Academy for Allied Health and Biomedical Sciences in Woodbridge Township and at its East Brunswick, Perth Amboy and Piscataway technical high schools, with no tuition charged to students for attendance.Locations, Middlesex County Vocational and Technical Schools. Accessed December 2, 2019.

There have been two historical schools named for Benjamin Franklin. The Old Franklin Schoolhouse is a one-room school on Route 27 (Middlesex Avenue) near Main Street built in 1807 and used until 1870. In 1906, it was acquired and restored by the Borough Improvement League and is currently used as a community music venue. A larger Franklin School, built in 1906, once stood at the intersection of Middlesex and Lake Avenues but fell into disrepair in the mid-1980s. It has since been demolished to make way for a residential development called Franklin Square."Townhouses will replace old school in Metuchen", The Star-Ledger, February 4, 1999.

Private schools
The borough is home to St. Joseph High School, a private all-boys Catholic prep school, notable for its academics and sports awards, that is conducted by the Brothers of the Sacred Heart and operated under the supervision of the Roman Catholic Diocese of Metuchen.School Overview, Saint Joseph High School. Accessed July 28, 2013. Saint Francis Cathedral School, a Pre-K–8 school also operated as part of the Roman Catholic Diocese of Metuchen, was one of eight private schools recognized in 2017 as an Exemplary High Performing School by the National Blue Ribbon Schools Program of the United States Department of Education.

Historic district

The Middlesex Avenue–Woodwild Park Historic District is a historic district located in Metuchen. It was added onto the National Register of Historic Places on July 31, 2017. It includes 197 contributing buildings, five contributing objects, and one contributing site.

Transportation
Commuting had become a way of life for Metuchen residents by the start of the 20th century. Daily commuters numbered 400 out of a population of 1,786 by the year 1900. Accessibility to New York City and New Brunswick enhanced the borough's reputation as a place to live, and the modern suburban ideal of small-town life where tired businessmen could escape the pace of the city grew in popularity.

Roads and highways

The biggest change to affect Metuchen between the World Wars was the rise of the automobile. In the 1920s, service stations were built, and the construction of U.S. Route 1 just south of Metuchen in 1930 diverted traffic away from Middlesex Avenue, helping the borough retain its residential character.

Both Route 27 and CR 531 pass through and intersect at the heart of the borough, while Interstate 287 runs along the southern border. Metuchen also includes portions of CR 501, CR 660 and CR 669.Middlesex County Route 669 Straight Line Diagram, New Jersey Department of Transportation, updated June 2011. Accessed December 5, 2019.

Other limited access roads are nearby, such as the New Jersey Turnpike (Interstate 95) in surrounding Edison Township and the Garden State Parkway in Woodbridge Township.

Public transportation
The Metuchen station provides service to many destinations along NJ Transit's Northeast Corridor Line between the Trenton Transit Center and New York Penn Station.

NJ Transit local bus service is available on the 810, 813 and 819 routes.

Notable people

People who were born in, residents of, or otherwise closely associated with Metuchen include:

 Joy M. Bergelson (born 1962), professor of genomics at New York University
 Marqus Blakely (born 1988), two-time America East Men's Basketball Player of the Year, winner of 2010 slam dunk contest
 Charles Brown (1946–2004), actor
 Henry T. Brown (1932–2020), chemical engineer who was the first African American in borough government
 Barbara Buono (born 1953), New Jersey State Senator
 John Ciardi (1916–1986), poet
 David Copperfield (born 1956), magician and illusionist"The life by David Copperfield", Accessed November 21, 2006.
 Scott Cowen (born 1946), president of Tulane University
 Paula Danziger (1944–2004), children's author who wrote more than 30 books, including her 1974 debut young adult novel, The Cat Ate My Gymsuit Betsy Dunn, politician who served in the Vermont House of Representatives from 2017 to 2019
 Bernard J. Dwyer (1921–1998), politician, who served in the United States House of Representatives from New Jersey from 1981 to 1993
 Gail Fisher (1935–2000), first black actress to win an Emmy
 James Florio (born 1937), Governor of New Jersey from 1990 to 1994
 Mary Eleanor Wilkins Freeman (1852–1930), author and novelist
 James Freis (born 1970), global fraud expert and former Director of the Financial Crimes Enforcement Network
 Samuel L. Greitzer (1905–1988), mathematician who was founding chairman of the United States of America Mathematical Olympiad
 Robert Hegyes (1951–2012), actor who played the character "Epstein" in the 1970s TV series Welcome Back, Kotter Cecelia Holland (born 1943), historical novelist
 Elie Honig, attorney and CNN senior legal analyst
 Ed Kalegi (born 1967), voice actor, radio personality, host and actor
 Robert Kaplow (born ), teacher and novelist whose coming-of-age novel was made into a film titled Me and Orson Welles Jerome H. Lemelson (1923–1997), inventor and holder of more than 550 patents
 Lonny Price (born 1959), actor, writer and director
 Thomas Mundy Peterson (1824–1904), first African-American to vote in an election under the just-enacted provisions of the 15th Amendment to the United States Constitution
 Hester Martha Poole (1833–1932), American writer, poet, art critic, artist, and an advocate for women's rightsWillard, Frances E.; and Livermore, Mary A. A Woman of the Century: Fourteen Hundred-seventy Biographical Sketches Accompanied by Portraits of Leading American Women in All Walks of Life, p. 585. Charles Wells Moulton, 1893. Accessed July 9, 2020. "Poole, Mrs. Hester Martha, author, artist and critic was born in western Vermont, around 1843.... Her present residence is in Metuchen, N. J."
 Brian Ralph (born 1973), alternative cartoonist, whose graphic novel, Daybreak, was adapted for the Netflix series Daybreak Nancy A. Roseman, 28th president of Dickinson College
 Tom Ruegger (born 1955/1956), animator, screenwriter, storyboard artist and lyricist, who created Animaniacs and Histeria! Quinn Shephard (born 1995), actress, writer, director and producer, whose directorial debut film Blame was shot in Metuchen
 Robert Taub (born 1955), concert pianist, recording artist, scholar, author and entrepreneur
 Jack Waldman (1952–1986), jazz and rock musician, composer, producer, vocalist and multi-instrumentalist
 Marvin Webster (1952–2009), former professional basketball player who spent half his NBA career with the New York Knicks
 Richard Wenk (born 1956), screenwriter and director best known for his work on The Expendables 2 (2012), The Equalizer (2014), and The Magnificent Seven'' (2016)
 Julian E. Zelizer (born 1969), author and professor of political history at Princeton University

References

External links

 Metuchen Borough website
 Metuchen School District
 
 School Data for the Metuchen School District, National Center for Education Statistics
 Metuchen-Edison Historical Society website
 Metuchen Public Library website

 
1900 establishments in New Jersey
Borough form of New Jersey government
Boroughs in Middlesex County, New Jersey
Populated places established in 1900
Enclaves in the United States